Tai Tao Tsuen is a village in Yuen Long District, New Territories, Hong Kong.

Administration
Tai Tao Tsuen is one of the 37 villages represented within the Ping Shan Rural Committee. For electoral purposes, Tai Tao Tsuen is part of the Ping Shan South constituency.

References

External links
 Delineation of area of existing village Tai To Tsuen (Ping Shan) for election of resident representative (2019 to 2022)

Villages in Yuen Long District, Hong Kong